meso-Butestrol (developmental code name SC-3402), also known as 2,3-bis(4-hydroxyphenyl)butane, is a synthetic nonsteroidal estrogen which was never marketed. It is a so-called "short-acting" or "impeded" estrogen. meso-Butestrol is structurally related to diethylstilbestrol and other stilbestrols. The fully potent counterpart to meso-butestrol is meso-hexestrol, analogously to the relationship of dimethylstilbestrol to diethylstilbestrol.

See also
 Butestrol

References

Abandoned drugs
Phenols
Synthetic estrogens